Hafiz Mazhar Ud Din Ramdasi (1914-1981) was an Islamic scholar, columnist, and poet who was also known as Hassan Ul Asar. He wrote the Kashmir anthem, "Mary watan teri jannat main aain gay ik din" (میرے وطن تیری جنت میں آئیں گے اک دن).

Published Books
Bab e Jibreel https://www.scribd.com/doc/52932866/Bab-e-Jibreel-Naatia-Kalam-by-Hafiz-Mazhar-Ud-Din
Meezab https://www.scribd.com/doc/27163562/Mizab-Naatia-Kalam-by-Hafiz-Mazhar-ud-din
Jalwa Gah https://www.scribd.com/doc/42422233/Jalwa-Gah-Naatia-Kalam-by-Hafiz-Mazhar-ud-Din
Tajaliat https://www.scribd.com/doc/27501005/Tajalliyat-Naatia-Kalam-by-Hafiz-Mazhar-ud-Din
Nishan e Rah I
Nishan e Rah II
Hadees e Ishq (Nishan e Rah III)
Khatim ul Mursalin https://www.scribd.com/doc/47287988/Khaatam-ul-Mursaleen
 Shameheer o Sana
 Harb o Zarab
 Wadiye Neel (an Urdu transalarion of Arma Noosa Almisriya in Arabic by Jurji Zidan)

References
'Zikr e Pakan' by Tufail Nasri in 1979
'Lazzat Aashnai' by Professor Nazar Sabri
'MATAE GUM GASHTA' by Hafiz Ludhianvi
'JINHAIN MAIN NAY DAIKHA'  BY KOSAR NIAZI

External links
 https://hafizmazhar.blogspot.com/

Pakistani male poets
Pakistani Sunni Muslim scholars of Islam
Scholars from Amritsar
Writers from Amritsar